Jon and the Nightriders were an American surf music band known for instrumental rock. Surf music's "2nd Wave" began in 1979 with the release of the first Jon and the Nightriders record.

The band was formed in 1979 by John Blair. Original members of the band included Dusty Watson, and Greg Eckler (who is credited with starting Psalm 150 in 1974).

Their songs have reappeared in the film, Surf II ("Fuel Injected" and "Surf Jam").

The punk rock band Jughead's Revenge included "Rumble at Waikiki" by Jon and the Nightriders, in their 1996 Image Is Everything album.

Discography

 1979: (EP) Jon and the Nightriders ["Rumble At Waikiki" / "Bustin' Surfboards" / "Ali Baba" / "Squad Car"] (California Records) 
 1980: Surf Beat '80 (Voxx Records (Bomp!))
 1981: Recorded Live at Hollywood's Famous Whisky a Go-Go (Voxx Records)
 1981: (EP) California Fun! (Line Records [Germany])
 1982: (EP) Splashback! (prod. by Shel Talmy, Invasion Records)
 1984: Charge of the Nightriders (prod. by Shel Talmy, Enigma) 
 1987: Stampede! (Rockhouse Kix 4 U [Netherlands]
 1996: Fiberglass Rocket (Atomic Beat/AVI)
 1998: Raw & Alive '98 (Gee-Dee Music [Germany])
 1999: Moving Target (Gee-Dee Music [Germany]) 
 2000: Undercover (Surf Waves [Belgium])
Compilation
 2018: Rumble at Waikiki: The John Blair Anthology (Bear Family) 2-CD

References

External links
 johnblair.us Jon and the Nightriders Discography
 

Surf music groups
Musical groups established in 1979
Musical groups from California